Katie Did It is a 1951 American romantic comedy film directed by Frederick De Cordova and starring Ann Blyth, Mark Stevens and Cecil Kellaway. A small town girl falls in love with a big city artist, but mistakenly believes he already has a wife and children.

Plot

Partial cast
 Ann Blyth as Katherine Standish  
 Mark Stevens as Peter Van Arden  
 Cecil Kellaway as Nathaniel B. Wakeley VI  
 Jesse White as Jim Dilloway  
 Harold Vermilyea as Merill T. Grumby  
 Craig Stevens as Stuart Grumby 
 William H. Lynn as Clarence Spivvens  
 Elizabeth Patterson as Aunt Priscilla Wakely  
 Jimmy Hunt as Steven Goodrich  
 Irving Bacon as Conductor  
 Raymond Largay as Rev. Turner  
 Peter Leeds as 'Odds' Burton  
 Ethyl May Halls as Abigail

References

Bibliography
 Stephens, Michael L. Art Directors in Cinema: A Worldwide Biographical Dictionary. McFarland, 1998.

External links
 

1951 films
1951 romantic comedy films
American romantic comedy films
Films directed by Frederick de Cordova
Universal Pictures films
Films scored by Frank Skinner
American black-and-white films
1950s English-language films
1950s American films